Libourne is a commune in the Gironde department in Nouvelle-Aquitaine in southwestern France. It is a sub-prefecture of the department.

It is the wine-making capital of northern Gironde and lies near Saint-Émilion and Pomerol.

Geography
Libourne is located at the confluence of the Isle and Dordogne rivers. Libourne station has rail connections to Bordeaux, Bergerac, Angoulême, Périgueux, Limoges, Brive-la-Gaillarde and Sarlat-la-Canéda.

History
In 1270, Leybornia was founded as a bastide by Roger de Leybourne (of Leybourne, Kent), an English seneschal of Gascony, under the authority of King Edward I of England. It suffered considerably in the struggles of the French and English for the possession of Gironde in the 14th century, and joined France in the 15th century.

In December 1854 John Stuart Mill passed through Libourne, remarking "I stopped at Libourne as I intended & had a walk about it this morning quite the best thing there is the bridge of the Dordogne, the view from which is really fine".

Population

Sights
On the quay there is a machicolated clock-tower which is a survival of the defensive walls of the 14th century. The town-house, containing a small museum and a library, is a quaint relic of the 16th century. It is located by the main square, the Place Abel Surchamp, which hosts every weekend one of the largest fresh food market in the region. There is a statue of Élie, duc Decazes, who was born in the region.

Notable people 

 Eugène Atget (1857–1927), French photographer, "Creator and Purveyor of a Collection of Photographic Views of Old France"
 Florian Latorre (born 1997), racing driver
 Louis Le Provost de Launay (1850–1912), French deputy and senator
 Jean-Marie Londeix (1932–), French saxophonist
 Jean Marcadé (1920–2012), French Hellenist and historian
 Jean-Marie Poumeyrol, (born 1946), artist

See also
 Hull town walls, the town of Hull, also established under Edward I, is said to have been similar in design to the Bastides, in particular Libourne
 Communes of the Gironde department
 Keynsham, twinned with Libourne

References

External links

 Official website (in French)
 Unofficial website (in French)

Communes of Gironde
Subprefectures in France
Guyenne